Color Machine is an album by Boston-based rock group The Lights Out inspired from the tracks on their EPs, The Lights Out and ¡Heist!. It was self-released in September 2009.

Reception
The album received positive reviews and listings from publications and websites such as 
The Boston Phoenix 
The Boston Globe 
The Boston Herald 
The Music Slut 
Playground Boston

Track listing
 "Money Or Time"
 "Gottagetouttahere"
 "Red Letter Day"
 "Liquid"
 "Five Seventeen"
 "Never Going Back"
 "Ms. Fortune"
 "Stormy"
 "Count Me Out"
 "Get Up Get Up"
 "Last Hurrah"
 "New Gets Old"
 "Danny Partridge"

The Lights Out (EP)

The Lights Out is an EP by The Lights Out, self-released in 2007. The majority of the songs were later used to create Color Machine.

Track listing
 "Make Me"
 "Count Me Out"
 "Miss Fortune"
 "Last Hurrah"

¡Heist! (EP)

¡Heist! is an EP by The Lights Out, self-released in 2008. The majority of the songs were later used to create Color Machine.

Track listing
 "Money Or Time"
 "Liquid"
 "Never Going Back"
 "Get Up Get Up"
 "New Gets Old"

References

External links
The Boston Herald
The Boston Globe

2009 albums
The Lights Out albums